New Britain station is a SEPTA Regional Rail station in New Britain, Pennsylvania. Located at Tamenend and Matthews Avenues, it serves the Lansdale/Doylestown Line. On December 18, 2011, weekend service was discontinued at this station due to low ridership. In the fall of 2012, New Britain was added back to the weekend schedule as a flag stop. The station continues to have full service on weekdays. In FY 2013, the station had a weekday average of 51 boardings and 58 alightings.

Station layout

References

External links
 SEPTA - New Britain Station
 Former New Britain P&R Station Image
 December 28, 2001 southbound view by Bob Vogel(World-NYC Subway.org)
 Station from Tamenend Avenue from Google Maps Street View

SEPTA Regional Rail stations
Stations on the Doylestown Line
Railway stations in Bucks County, Pennsylvania